Ibresinsky District (Yĕpreś rayonĕ) is an administrative and municipal district (raion), one of the twenty-one in the Chuvash Republic, Russia. It is located in the southern central part of the republic and borders with Vurnarsky and Kanashsky Districts in the north, Komsomolsky District in the east, Batyrevsky and Alatyrsky Districts in the south, and with Shumerlinsky and Poretsky Districts in the west. Its administrative center is the urban locality (an urban-type settlement) of Ibresi. Population:

History
The district was formed on September 5, 1944.

Notable residents 

Lidiya Grigoryeva  (born 1974 in Smychka), long-distance runner

See also
Alshikhovo

References

Notes

Sources

Districts of Chuvashia
